Benjamin Stratton (born 1 March 1989) is a former Australian rules footballer who played for the Hawthorn Football Club in the Australian Football League (AFL).

Early career 
Stratton was educated at Dunsborough Primary School and MacKillop Catholic College in Busselton. He played for the Augusta Margaret River Football Club before being recruited to East Perth.  He then spent three years playing in the West Australian Football League (WAFL), playing 23 senior games and kicked three goals for East Perth. A medium-sized defender, Stratton was drafted from East Perth with the 46th selection in the 2009 AFL Draft.

AFL career 

Stratton made his AFL debut against Western Bulldogs in round 3 of the 2010 AFL season. Despite being a mature-age rookie, Stratton was awarded the AFL Rising Star nomination for round 14, against the Bulldogs once more.

He dislocated his knee in the third quarter of the Hawks’ win against Richmond in round 3 of the 2011 season and had surgery to repair his posterior cruciate ligament and have the lateral ligament in his right knee stabilised. He missed the most of the remainder of the year, he returned to play in the last home and away game of the season against the Gold Coast Suns and all the 2011 final series.

After a solid 2012 season where he played every game, he was singled out for praise by coach Alastair Clarkson after performing a match saving tackle on Adelaide's Patrick Dangerfield in the Preliminary Final. However, the Hawks lost the Grand Final to Sydney by 10 points, with Stratton having a quiet game, but restricting Sam Reid to one goal.

Stratton again played every game in 2013, including notching up his 50th consecutive game in the first qualifying final against Sydney. Stratton again played in the Grand Final, with Hawthorn defeating Fremantle and granting him his first premiership.

Stratton's consecutive run was broken in 2014 after a hamstring injury forced him to miss the first 4 rounds of the year. He would return to the side, playing consistent football. Hawthorn would triumph in the 2014 Grand Final over the Sydney Swans, giving Stratton his second premiership.

Stratton played all but one game in the 2015 season, generally performing well and picking up his third premiership after Hawthorn defeated West Coast in the Grand Final.

Despite suffering from a pectoral injury in round 20, Stratton was regarded as having a good 2016 season, drawing especial praise for his performance in round 3 on Western Bulldogs forward Jake Stringer.

Stratton had a good start to 2017, but he injured his posterior cruciate ligament once again in round 8, sidelining him for the rest of the season.

Stratton played his 150th game against Melbourne in round 4 of the 2018 season. Stratton had a decent year in 2018, finishing seventh in Hawthorn's best and fairest medal tally.

Captaincy
He was appointed captain of the club at the start of the 2019 season. In round 13 Stratton was suspended for repeatedly pinching Essendon opponent Orazio Fantasia as well as stomping on Shaun McKernan. He received a one week suspension for each incident. Stratton was the subject of a considerable negative reaction for these actions, with Hawthorn CEO (Justin Reeves) declaring that he had 'let himself and the club down'.

On the 14th of September 2020, it was announced that Stratton would retire from the AFL following the 2020 season. He played his final game for Hawthorn the following Sunday in a 108-57 win over the Gold Coast Suns.

Statistics

|-  
| 2010 ||  || 39
| 21 || 1 || 0 || 184 || 107 || 291 || 108 || 43 || 0.0 || 0.0 || 8.8 || 5.1 || 13.9 || 5.1 || 2.0 || 0
|- 
| 2011 ||  || 24
| 6 || 0 || 0 || 39 || 34 || 73 || 24 || 21 || 0.0 || 0.0 || 6.5 || 5.7 || 12.2 || 4.0 || 3.5 || 0
|-  
| 2012 ||  || 24
| 25 || 0 || 0 || 175 || 118 || 293 || 97 || 70 || 0.0 || 0.0 || 7.0 || 4.7 || 11.7 || 3.9 || 2.8 || 0
|- 
| bgcolor=F0E68C | 2013# ||  || 24
| 25 || 0 || 1 || 192 || 175 || 367 || 123 || 74 || 0.0 || 0.0 || 7.7 || 7.0 || 14.7 || 4.9 || 3.0 || 0
|-  
| bgcolor=F0E68C | 2014# ||  || 24
| 15 || 0 || 0 || 98 || 98 || 196 || 59 || 46 || 0.0 || 0.0 || 6.5 || 6.5 || 13.1 || 3.9 || 3.1 || 0
|-
| bgcolor=F0E68C | 2015# ||  || 24
| 25 || 0 || 4 || 158 || 111 || 269 || 92 || 72 || 0.0 || 0.2 || 6.3 || 4.4 || 10.8 || 3.7 || 2.9 || 0
|- 
| 2016 ||  || 24
| 21 || 0 || 1 || 146 || 107 || 253 || 96 || 47 || 0.0 || 0.1 || 7.0 || 5.1 || 12.1 || 4.6 || 2.2 || 0
|-
| 2017 ||  || 24
| 8 || 0 || 0 || 54 || 50 || 104 || 27 || 24 || 0.0 || 0.0 || 6.8 || 6.3 || 13.0 || 3.4 || 3.0 || 0
|-  
| 2018 ||  || 24
| 23 || 0 || 0 || 164 || 116 || 280 || 93 || 44 || 0.0 || 0.0 || 7.1 || 5.0 || 12.2 || 4.0 || 1.9 || 0
|-
| 2019 ||  || 24
| 19 || 0 || 0 || 96 || 79 || 175 || 64 || 29 || 0.0 || 0.0 || 5.1 || 4.2 || 9.2 || 3.4 || 1.5 || 0
|-  
| 2020 ||  || 24
| 14 || 1 || 0 || 66 || 55 || 121 || 41 || 17 || 0.1 || 0.0 || 4.7 || 3.9 || 8.6 || 2.9 || 1.2 || 0
|- class="sortbottom"
! colspan=3| Career
! 202 !! 2 !! 6 !! 1372 !! 1050 !! 2422 !! 824 !! 487 !! 0.0 !! 0.0 !! 6.8 !! 5.2 !! 12.0 !! 4.1 !! 2.4 !! 0
|}

Notes

Honours and achievements
Team
 3× AFL premiership player: 2013, 2014, 2015
 2× Minor premiership: 2012, 2013

Individual
 Hawthorn captain: 2019–2020
 Lethal Award: 2018
  best clubman: 2015
  most consistent player: 2013
  best first year player (debut season): 2010
 AFL Rising Star nominee: 2010
  life member

References

External links

 

Hawthorn Football Club players
Hawthorn Football Club Premiership players
1989 births
Living people
Australian rules footballers from Western Australia
East Perth Football Club players
Box Hill Football Club players
People from Margaret River, Western Australia
Augusta-Margaret River Football Club players
Three-time VFL/AFL Premiership players